Broad Street Independent Chapel is a former nonconformist chapel dating from 1707. It is situated in Broad Street, now the principal shopping street of the English town of Reading. The building has been reused as a branch of the Waterstone's chain of bookshops. The building is a Grade II listed building.

History 

The main building was built in 1707 and is set back from Broad Street. The interior is roughly square with encircling galleries, and a domed ceiling with modillion cornice. Later additions were made to the side and rear of the original building. In 1892 a separate frontage building was built along the building line of Broad Street, with an arch surmounted by a tower, itself capped by octagonal turret, and flanked by two shops.

Waterstone's now occupies both the chapel building and most of the frontage building (one shop unit being independently occupied). The frontage building has been linked to the main chapel by a lightweight modern glass-roofed conservatory. The galleries of the main chapel now form part of the shop, with a sweeping staircase in the centre linking the two floors.

Details of baptisms and marriages at the church between 1720 and 1837 are available on the International Genealogical Index produced by the LDS Church. William Blackall Simonds, the founder of H & G Simonds Brewery and J & C Simonds Bank, was baptised at the chapel on 13 August 1761.

References

External links

Reading, Broad Street Independent
Grade II listed buildings in Reading
Retail buildings in England
Bookshops of England
Grade II listed churches in Berkshire